This is a list of all of the songs that DJ Scratch has produced.

1990s

EPMD – Business As Usual (1990)

 14. Funky Piano

Various Artists – We're All In The Same Gang (1990)

 02. I Got Style (featuring New World Mafia)
 Produced with Michael Concepcion
 07. Keep Funkin' It (featuring MC KRZ)
 Produced with Johnny Jackson
 09. Livin' In South Central L.A. (featuring South Central Posse)

EPMD – Business Never Personal (1992)

 06. Scratch Bring It Back (Part 2-Mic Doc)

PMD – Shade Business (1994)

 07. I'll Wait (featuring Zone 7)
 08. I Saw It Cummin'
 Produced with Parrish Smith

Das EFX – Hold It Down (1995)

 17. Comin' Thru
 19. Bad News (featuring PMD)

PMD – Business Is Business (1996)

 11. Nuttin Move (featuring Das Efx)
 12. I'm A B-Boy

Busta Rhymes – Flipmode Remixes (1996)

 03. Woo-Hah!! Got You All In Check (The DJ Scratch Albany Projects Remix) (featuring Rampage)
 13. Do My Thing (DJ Scratch Remix) (Clean)
 14. Abandon Ship (DJ Scratch Remix) (Clean) (featuring Rampage)

Busta Rhymes – The Coming (1996)

 01. The Coming (Intro)
 Produced with Rick St. Hilaire
 02. Do My Thing
 12. The Finish Line

Various Artists – Set It Off Soundtrack (1996)

 05. Live To Regret (featuring Busta Rhymes)

Ill Al Skratch – Keep It Movin (1997)

 06. Stick & Move

EPMD – Back in Business (1997)

 10. Put On

Rampage – Scouts Honor...By Way of Blood (1997)

 01. Intro (featuring DJ Scratch, Kareem, Storm & Kau Kidau)
 Produced with Rampage
 02. Flipmode Iz Da Squad (featuring Busta Rhymes, Lord Have Mercy, Serious & Spliff Star)
 04. Talk Of The Town
 05. Get The Money And Dip (featuring Busta Rhymes)
 08. Flipmode Enemy #1 (featuring Serious)
 10. Conquer Da World (featuring Meka)
 11. Hall Of Fame
 14. Rampage Outro

Busta Rhymes – When Disaster Strikes... (1997)

 01. Intro
 02. The Whole World Looking At Me
 03. Survival Hungry
 04. When Disaster Strikes
 06. Get High Tonight
 11. We Could Take It Outside (featuring Flipmode Squad)
 18. Get Off My Block (featuring Lord Have Mercy)
 19. Outro (Preparation For The Final World Front)

Funkmaster Flex – 60 Minutes Of Funk – The Mix Tape Volume III (1998)

 23. Wu-Tang Cream Team Line-Up (featuring The Harlem Hoodz, Inspectah Deck, Killa Sin, Method Man & Raekwon)

Busta Rhymes – E.L.E. (Extinction Level Event): The Final World Front (1998)

 10. Gimme Some More
 12. Party Is Goin' On Over Here
 13. Do The Bus A Bus
 19. Outro – The Burial Song

Various Artists – Lyricist Lounge, Volume One (1998)

 2-05. Be OK (featuring Bahamadia & Rah Digga)

Onyx – Shut 'Em Down (1998)

 03. Street Nigguz (featuring X1)
 10. Conspiracy (featuring Clay The Raider & X1)
 11. Black Dust (featuring X1)

Flipmode Squad – The Imperial (1998)

 02. To My People
 05. I Got Your Back
 06. This Is What Happens
 07. Everybody On The Line Outside
 09. Where You Think You Goin'
 12. Money Talks
 13. Cha Cha Cha
 15. Do For Self

DJ Clue – The Professional (1998)

 11. Whatever You Want (featuring Flipmode Squad)

Q-Tip – Amplified (1999)

 09. Do It (featuring Jessica Rivera)
 11. N.T. (featuring Busta Rhymes)

Method Man & Redman – Blackout! (1999)

 10. 1, 2, 1, 2

Pharoahe Monch – Internal Affairs (1999)

 01. Intro
 09. Right Here

EPMD – Out Of Business (1999)

 01. Intro

50 Cent – Power of the Dollar (1999)

 16. I'm A Hustler

Funkmaster Flex & Big Kap – The Tunnel (1999)

 15. Ill Bomb (featuring LL Cool J)

2000s

Lord Have Mercy – Thee Ungodly Hour (2000) (Unreleased)
 00. Wicked Ways
 00. Vengeance
 00. The Last Night On This Earth
 00. 6 Million Ways

Busta Rhymes – Anarchy (2000)
 02. Salute Da Gods!!
 16. We Comin' Through
 17. C'mon All My Niggaz, C'mon All My Bitches

Erick Onasis – Def Squad Presents Erick Onasis (2000)
 02. I Do 'Em

LL Cool J – G.O.A.T. (2000)
 04. LL Cool J (featuring Kandice Love)
 11. Hello (featuring Amil)
 12. You And Me (featuring Kelly Price)
 13. Homicide
 14. U Can't Fuck With Me (featuring Jayo Felony, Snoop Dogg & Xzibit)
 17. Ill Bomb (featuring Funkmaster Flex & Big Kap)

Various Artists – Any Given Sunday Soundtrack (2000)
 05. Shut 'Em Down (featuring LL Cool J)

Guru – Jazzmatazz, Vol. 3: Streetsoul (2000)
 02. Keep Your Worries (featuring Angie Stone)

Half-A-Mill – Milíon (2000)
 06. Don't Go Away

Tony Touch – The Piece Maker (2000)
 06. Likwit Rhyming (featuring Defari, Tash & Xzibit)

Various Artists – Bamboozled Soundtrack (2000)
 01. Blak Iz Blak (featuring Mau Maus)

Tha Liks – X.O. Experience (2001)
 06. Bully Foot (featuring Busta Rhymes)

Sticky Fingaz – Black Trash: The Autobiography of Kirk Jones (2001)
 07. Why (featuring Still Livin & X1)
 11. Baby Brother (featuring Dave Hollister)
 17. Get It Up (featuring Fredro Starr)

Busta Rhymes – It Ain't Safe No More (2002)
 03. What Do You Do When You're Branded

The Roots – Phrenology (2002)
 02. Rock You

Talib Kweli – Quality (2002)
 04. Shock Body (featuring McKay)

Snoop Dogg – Snoop Dogg Presents…Doggy Style Allstars Vol. 1 (2002)
 11. I Just Get Carried Away (featuring Reo Varnado & Vinnie Bernard)

DMX – Grand Champ (2003)
 17. The Rain

Fabolous – More Street Dreams Pt. 2: The Mixtape (2003)
 04. Now Ride

DJ Kay Slay – The Streetsweeper Vol. 1 (2003)
 04. 50 Shot Ya (featuring 50 Cent)

Various Artists – Honey Soundtrack (2003)
 09. Now Ride (featuring Fabolous)

Monica – After the Storm (2003)
 02. Get It Off (featuring Dirtbag)
 Produced with Craig Brockman

Cassidy – I'm A Hustla (2005)
 07. Can't Fade Me (featuring Nas & Quan)

Beanie Sigel – The B. Coming (2005)
 06. Purple Rain (featuring Bun B)

Busta Rhymes – The Big Bang (2006)
 04. New York Shit
 Samples "Faded Lady" by Soul Sensual Orchestra

Wu-Tang Clan – 8 Diagrams (2007)
 00. Watch Your Mouth, co-produced with RZA

LL Cool J – Exit 13 (2008)
 09. Rocking with the G.O.A.T.
 10. This Is Ring Tone M... (featuring Grandmaster Caz)

Busta Rhymes – I Bullshit You Not (mixtape) (2009)
 01. Fate of The World
 02. Director's Cut (featuring Uncle Murda)
 03. Let's Do It (featuring Spliff Star)
 04. Foreign Currency (featuring Maino)
 05. Piano Man (featuring Spliff Star & Reek Da Villian)
 06. Death Wish (featuring Raekwon)
 07. Try Your Hands (featuring Show Money)
 08. The Game Room (Featuring Lil' Fame)
 09. Victim
 10. Give a Damn (featuring Show Money & Reek Da Villian)
 11. Bounce Back
 12. Feel My Pain

Busta Rhymes – Back on My B.S. (2009)
 01. Wheel Of Fortune
 08. I'm A Go And Get My... (featuring Mike Epps)

Method Man & Redman – Blackout! 2 (2009)
 12. Dis Iz 4 All My Smokers

2010s

DJ Kay Slay – More Than Just a DJ (2010)
 01. Intro (featuring Busta Rhymes)

Busta Rhymes & Q-Tip – The Abstract and the Dragon (2013)
 03. Gettin' Up (DJ Scratch Remix)

2020s

Busta Rhymes – Extinction Level Event 2: The Wrath of God (2020)
 09. Boomp!

RZA / Bobby Digital – Saturday Afternoon Kung Fu Theater (2022)
 whole album

Unreleased Production

Rah Digga
 Handle Your B.I.

Half-A-Mill
 Half-A-Mill Demo Tape (Unreleased 1995 album)

Production discographies
Discographies of American artists
Hip hop discographies